Tamil Nadu State Highway 161 (SH-161) is a State Highway maintained by the Highways Department of Government of Tamil Nadu. It connects Namakkal with Kannanur in Tamil Nadu.

Route
The route is from NamakkalKannanur, via Erumaipatti, Varagur and Thathaiyangarpet.

See also 
 Highways of Tamil Nadu

References 

State highways in Tamil Nadu
Road transport in Tiruchirappalli